Gerardo Aranda Orozco (born 21 April 1952) is a Mexican politician from the National Action Party. From 2006 to 2009 he served as Deputy of the LX Legislature of the Mexican Congress representing Sonora.

References

1952 births
Living people
Politicians from Sonora
National Action Party (Mexico) politicians
21st-century Mexican politicians
Monterrey Institute of Technology and Higher Education alumni
Deputies of the LX Legislature of Mexico
Members of the Chamber of Deputies (Mexico) for Sonora